Symmoca is a genus of moths in the family Autostichidae.

Species
Symmoca achrestella Rebel, 1889
Symmoca achromatella Turati, 1930
Symmoca alacris Meyrick, 1918
Symmoca albicanella Zeller, 1868
Symmoca alhambrella Walsingham, 1911
Symmoca arcuata Gozmány, 2008
Symmoca ascalaphus Gozmány, 2008
Symmoca attalica Gozmány, 1957
Symmoca calidella Walsingham, 1905
Symmoca caliginella Mann, 1867
Symmoca capnistis Gozmány, 2008
Symmoca christenseni Gozmány, 1982
Symmoca cinerariella Mann, 1859
Symmoca costimacula Turati, 1930
Symmoca costobscurella Amsel, 1949
Symmoca crocodesma Meyrick, 1911
Symmoca degregorioi Requena, 2007
Symmoca deprinsi Gozmány, 2001
Symmoca deserticolella Turati, 1924
Symmoca designella Herrich-Schäffer, 1855
Symmoca dodecatella Staudinger, 1859
Symmoca dolomitana Huemer & Gozmány, 1992
Symmoca egregiella Lucas, 1956
Symmoca euxantha Gozmány, 2008
Symmoca fuscella Amsel, 1959
Symmoca hendrikseni Gozmány, 1996
Symmoca italica Gozmány, 1962
Symmoca latiusculella Stainton, 1867
Symmoca libanicolella Zerny, 1934
Symmoca longipalpella Rebel, 1914
Symmoca mannii Gozmány, 2008
Symmoca maschalista Meyrick, 1926
Symmoca megalomera Gozmány, 2008
Symmoca mimetica Gozmány, 2008
Symmoca minimella Caradja, 1920
Symmoca mobilella Zerny, 1936
Symmoca multicrassa Gozmány, 2008
Symmoca nigromaculella Ragonot, 1875
Symmoca nivalis Gozmány, 1988
Symmoca oenophila Staudinger, 1871
Symmoca orphnella Rebel, 1893
Symmoca paghmana Gozmány, 2008
Symmoca pelospora Meyrick, 1927
Symmoca perobscurata Gozmány, 1957
Symmoca petrogenes Walsingham, 1907
Symmoca ponerias Walsingham, 1905
Symmoca profanella Zerny, 1936
Symmoca pyrenaica Gozmány, 1985
Symmoca quinquepunctella Chretién, 1922
Symmoca revoluta Gozmány, 1985
Symmoca rifellus (Zerny, 1932)
Symmoca ronkayi Gozmány, 2008
Symmoca saharae (Oberthür, 1888)
Symmoca salem Gozmány, 1963
Symmoca salinata Gozmány, 1986
Symmoca samum Gozmány, 1988
Symmoca saracenica Gozmány, 2008
Symmoca sattleri Gozmány, 1962
Symmoca secreta (Gozmány, 2008)
Symmoca sefidica Gozmány, 2008
Symmoca senora Gozmány, 1977
Symmoca senorita Gozmány, 1988
Symmoca serrata Gozmány, 1985
Symmoca sezam Gozmány, 1963
Symmoca shahriar Gozmány, 2008
Symmoca signatella Herrich-Schäffer, 1854
Symmoca signella Hübner, 1796
Symmoca simulans Gozmány, 1985
Symmoca solanella Amsel, 1953
Symmoca sorrisa Gozmány, 1985
Symmoca squalida Gozmány, 2008
Symmoca stigmaphora Gozmány, 2008
Symmoca straminella Gozmány, 1986
Symmoca striolatella Gozmány, 1963
Symmoca suffumata Gozmány, 1996
Symmoca sultan Gozmány, 1962
Symmoca sutteri Gozmány, 2000
Symmoca tofosella Rebel, 1893
Symmoca tunesica Gozmány, 1988
Symmoca umbrinella Zerny, 1936
Symmoca uniformella Rebel, 1900
Symmoca vetusta Meyrick, 1931
Symmoca vitiosella Zeller, 1868
Symmoca vojnitsi Gozmány, 2008

Former species
Symmoca desertella Turati, 1924
Symmoca klimeschiella Gozmány, 1959
Symmoca melitensis Amsel, 1954
Symmoca pleostigmella Rebel, 1917
Symmoca sparsella (de Joannis, 1891)
Symmoca torrida Gozmány, 1961
Symmoca tristella Caradja, 1920

References

External links
Images representing Symmoca at Consortium for the Barcode of Life

 
Symmocinae